The Milwaukee Brewers' 1994 season involved the Brewers' finishing 5th in the American League Central with a record of 53 wins and 62 losses.

Offseason
 December 14, 1993: Tony Diggs (minors) was traded by the Brewers to the St. Louis Cardinals for Ozzie Canseco.
 March 29, 1994: Juan Bell was released by the Brewers.

Regular season

By Friday, August 12, the Brewers had compiled a 53-62 record through 115 games. They had scored 547 runs (4.76 per game) and allowed 586 runs (5.10 per game). The 1994 season was permanently suspended on August 12, due to the 1994-95 Major League Baseball strike.

Opening Day starters
Alex Diaz
Cal Eldred
Darryl Hamilton
John Jaha
Dave Nilsson
Jody Reed
Kevin Seitzer
Bill Spiers
Greg Vaughn
Turner Ward

Season standings

Record vs. opponents

Roster

Player stats

Batting

Starters by position
Note: Pos = Position; G = Games played; AB = At bats; H = Hits; Avg. = Batting average; HR = Home runs; RBI = Runs batted in

Other batters
Note: G = Games played; AB = At bats; H = Hits; Avg. = Batting average; HR = Home runs; RBI = Runs batted in

Pitching

Starting pitchers
Note: G = Games pitched; IP = Innings pitched; W = Wins; L = Losses; ERA = Earned run average; SO = Strikeouts

Other pitchers
Note: G = Games pitched; IP = Innings pitched; W = Wins; L = Losses; ERA = Earned run average; SO = Strikeouts

Relief pitchers
Note: G = Games pitched; W = Wins; L = Losses; SV = Saves; ERA = Earned run average; SO = Strikeouts

Farm system

The Brewers' farm system consisted of seven minor league affiliates in 1994. The Brewers operated a Dominican Summer League team as a co-op with the Houston Astros. The El Paso Diablos won the Texas League championship.

References

1994 Milwaukee Brewers team page at Baseball Reference
1994 Milwaukee Brewers team page at www.baseball-almanac.com

Milwaukee Brewers seasons
Milwaukee Brewers season
Milwaukee Brew